The Brisbane Range is a mountain range near Brisbane, Queensland, Australia.

See also

List of mountains in Australia

References

Mountain ranges of Queensland
South East Queensland